is a town located in Takaoka District, Kōchi Prefecture, Japan.

Geography
Tsuno is located located in the mid-western part of Kochi Prefecture on the island of Shikoku. The town is surrounded by the Shikoku Mountains and the landscape is steep, with about 90% occupied by forests, and the area ratio of agricultural land and residential land is low. In the Hayama area, the Shinjo River runs east and west in the central area, and in the Higashitsuno area are the headlands of the Shimanto River.

Neighbouring municipalities 
Kōchi Prefecture
 Susaki
 Niyodogawa
 Tosa
 Sakawa
 Ochi
 Yusuhara
 Shimanto Town
Ehime Prefecture
 Kumakōgen

Climate
Tsuno has a Humid subtropical climate (Köppen Cfa) characterized by warm summers and cool winters with light snowfall.  The average annual temperature in Tsuno is 12.8 °C. The average annual rainfall is 2375 mm with September as the wettest month. The temperatures are highest on average in January, at around 23.4 °C, and lowest in January, at around 1.9 °C.

Demographics
Per Japanese census data, the population of Tsuno has been decreasing slowly since the 1960s.

History 
As with all of Kōchi Prefecture, the area of Tsuno was part of ancient Tosa Province. During the Edo period, the area was part of the holdings of Tosa Domain ruled by the Yamauchi clan from their seat at Kōchi Castle. The villages of Kamihayama (上半山村),  Shimohayama (下半山村) and  Higashitsuno (東津野村) ere established with the creation of the modern municipalities system on October 1, 1889. Kamihayama and Shimohayama merged to form the village of  Hayama on September 30, 1956. Hayama and Higahshi-Tsuno merged to form the town of Tsuno on February 1, 2005.

Government
Tsuno has a mayor-council form of government with a directly elected mayor and a unicameral village council of ten members. Tsuno, together with the municipalities of Nakatosa, Yusuhara, and Shimanto, contributes two members to the Kōchi Prefectural Assembly. In terms of national politics, the town is part of Kōchi 2nd district of the lower house of the Diet of Japan.

Economy
Tsuno's economy is based on agriculture (notable rice and green tea) and forestry.

Education
Tsuno has three public elementary schools and two public middle schools operated by the town government. The town does not have a high school.

Transportation

Railway
Tsuno has no passenger railway service. The nearest train stations as Susaki Station and Tosa-Shinjō Station on the JR Shikoku Dosan Line.

Highways

References

External links

Tsuno official website 

Towns in Kōchi Prefecture